Deb Verhoeven  is currently the Canada 150 Research Chair in Gender and Cultural Informatics at the University of Alberta. Previously she was Associate Dean of Engagement and Innovation at the University of Technology Sydney, and before this she was Professor of Media and Communication at Deakin University. Until 2011 she held the role of director of the AFI Research Collection at RMIT. A writer, broadcaster, film critic and commentator, Verhoeven is the author of more than 100 journal articles and book chapters. Her book Jane Campion published by Routledge, is a detailed case study of the commercial and cultural role of the auteur in the contemporary film industry.

Verhoeven achieved a level of notoriety in 2015 when she delivered a brief and pointed address to the annual conference of the Association of Digital Humanities Organizations (ADHO) in Sydney. The talk focused on the predominance of men taking to the stage at the conference, which Verhoeven described as a "parade of the patriarchs". It concludes with Verhoeven asking male leaders in the field of Digital Humanities to pass their expertise and their positions to people who do not look or sound like them, and to be "more than binary". The talk was subsequently circulated as a short video and has also been published.     

In 2008 Verhoeven was appointed inaugural deputy chair, National Film and Sound Archive (Aust.). In 2011 she was elected to the inaugural committee of the Australasian Association for Digital Humanities (aaDH). She served as chair of the 2015 Digital Humanities conference. She is the Director of the Humanities Networked Infrastructure project, a public virtual laboratory that combines data from may Australian cultural and research collections.

Verhoeven’s principal research interest lies in extending the limits of conventional film studies; exploring the intersection between cinema studies and other disciplines such as history, information management, geo-spatial science, statistics, urban studies and economics. Verhoeven is a leading proponent of the digital humanities in Australia. Her recent research has addressed the vast amounts of newly available ‘cultural data’ that has enabled unprecedented computational analysis in the humanities. In addition to scholarly publications and media appearances, she has focused on the development of online research resources such as the Cinema and Audiences Research Project (CAARP) database, an ongoing exploration of big cultural data (kinomatics)  and The Ultimate Gig Guide (TUGG) an online archive of live music information.

She was the inaugural director of the Humanities Networked Infrastructure (HuNI) project, a national linked data initiative intended to unite and unlock Australia's cultural datasets. The project is funded by NeCTAR (National eResearch Collaboration Tools and Resources). HuNI is a national Virtual Laboratory project developed as part of the Australian government’s NeCTAR (National e-Research Collaboration Tools and Resources) program. HuNI combines information from 31 of Australia’s most significant cultural datasets. These datasets comprise more than a million authoritative records relating to the people, organisations, objects and events that make up Australia's abundant cultural heritage. HuNI also enables researchers to work with and share this large-scale aggregation of cultural information. HuNI was developed as a partnership between 13 public institutions, led by Deakin University. It is now operated by UTS.

In 2013, Verhoeven initiated the Research My World collaboration between Deakin University and the crowdfunding platform Pozible to pilot the micro-financing of university research. On the basis of this initiative Verhoeven was recognised by Campus Review as Australia’s most innovative academic.

A former CEO of the Australian Film Institute, Verhoeven is a member of the Australian Film Critics Association, the Fédération Internationale de la Presse Cinématographique (FIPRESCI), an honorary life member of Women in Film and Television, an executive member of the International Cinema Audiences Research Group (ICARG), and a founding member of the Screen Economics Research Group (SERG). As a film critic Verhoeven is a regular critical contributor to various programs on ABC Radio National and appeared fortnightly on the high rating Jon Faine program on ABC Local Radio for seven years. She was film critic for The Melbourne Times for six years and ran film programs on various public radio stations around Melbourne for many years prior to this.

Verhoeven has an active role in film publishing. Until 2012, she was chair of the film journal Senses of Cinema and was editor of the journal Studies in Australasian Cinema (Intellect) in 2009/10.

Awards and fellowships
 2014 Winner (HuNI), Council of Humanities, Arts and Social Sciences (CHASS) Audience Award
 2010 Winner (bonza), Australian Teachers of Media (ATOM) Awards
 2009/2010  Honorary Creative Fellowship, State Library of Victoria
 2007 Visiting Professor, Som e Imagem, Escola das Artes, Universidade Católica Portuguesa, Porto
 2006 Media Star Award (Most Media Appearances), RMIT University
 2006 Highly Commended Finalist (Sheep and the Australian Cinema), Film and History Research and Writing Awards
 2006 Best Australian Cinema Book 2006–7 (Sheep and the Australian Cinema), Australian Film Critic’s Association

Selected publications
 Jane Campion, Routledge: London & New York, 2009
 Sheep and the Australian Cinema, Melbourne University Press: Melbourne, 2006
 Twin Peeks: Australian and New Zealand Feature Films, Damned Publishing: Melbourne, 1999

Selected media
 2014 HuNI: Helping Researchers Get Lucky, Video
 2014 Big Data at the Movies, The Conversation
 2014 Only at the Movies: Home Truths About Cinema Ticket Pricing, The Conversation
 2013 Short on Grant Money? Five Tips for Crowdfunding Success (Most Media Appearances), The Conversation
 2015 Has Anyone Seen a Woman? Video
 2016 Women Aren't the Problem in the Film Industry, Men Are, The Conversation

References

External links
 

Living people
Academic staff of Deakin University
Academic staff of the University of Alberta
Year of birth missing (living people)
Place of birth missing (living people)
People in digital humanities